Sarkar Murmu was an Indian politician belonging to the Communist Party of India. He was elected to the Lok Sabha, lower house of the Parliament of India from Balurghat , West Bengal.

References

External links 
Official biographical sketch in Parliament of India website 

1926 births
India MPs 1962–1967
Santali people
Communist Party of India politicians from West Bengal
Lok Sabha members from West Bengal
Possibly living people